Hedong Township is a township under the administration of Dayu County, in southern Jiangxi, China. , it has five villages under its administration.

References 

Township-level divisions of Jiangxi
Dayu County